Janos Hari (born 3 May 1992) is a Hungarian professional ice hockey winger who currently plays for Fehérvár AV19 of the ICE Hockey League (ICEHL). He previously played in the Swedish Hockey League with Modo Hockey and Leksands IF.

Playing career
After three seasons in Sweden, Hari left to sign a one-year deal with German outfit, Düsseldorfer EG of the DEL, on 7 June 2017.

Career statistics

Regular season and playoffs

References

External links

1992 births
Djurgårdens IF Hockey players
Fehérvár AV19 players
HIFK (ice hockey) players
Lahti Pelicans players
Leksands IF players
Living people
Modo Hockey players
Montreal Junior Hockey Club players
Hungarian ice hockey left wingers
Rouyn-Noranda Huskies players
EC Red Bull Salzburg players
Ice hockey people from Budapest